Eric André Wilson (born September 26, 1994) is an American football inside linebacker who is a free agent. He played college football at Northwestern and Cincinnati, and signed with the Minnesota Vikings as an undrafted free agent in 2017. He has also played for the Philadelphia Eagles, Houston Texans, and New Orleans Saints.

Early years
Wilson played high school football at Lee M. Thurston High School in Redford, Michigan. He recorded 64 tackles and four sacks in his senior year. He played safety , linebacker, and wide receiver at Lee M. Thurston. He also earned All-State, All-Conference, All-Metro  and Team MVP honors while at Lee M. Thurston. He lettered three years in football, four years in track and one year in basketball and was a long jump State Champion.

College career
Wilson redshirted for the Northwestern Wildcats of Northwestern University in 2012. He transferred to the University of Cincinnati in 2013, where he played for the Cincinnati Bearcats from 2013 to 2016. He sat out the 2013 season due to NCAA transfer rules. He was named Second-team All-AAC in 2015 and First-team All-AAC in 2016. He played in 38 games, starting 24, during his college career. He graduated from Cincinnati in December 2016 with a degree in sports management.

Professional career
Wilson was rated the 21st best outside linebacker in the 2017 NFL Draft by NFLDraftScout.com. The website also predicted that he would be selected in the seventh round. Lance Zierlein of NFL.com predicted that he would be drafted in the fifth or sixth round.

Minnesota Vikings
Wilson signed with the Minnesota Vikings as an undrafted free agent on May 1, 2017. Wilson made his first career sack in week 11 of the 2018 season against the Chicago Bears when he sacked quarterback Mitchell Trubisky in a 25–20 loss.

In week 3 of the 2019 season against the Oakland Raiders, Wilson recorded 2 sacks on Derek Carr in the 34–14 win. In week 17 against the Chicago Bears, Wilson recorded a team high 12 tackles and sacked Trubisky once during the 21–19 loss.

On March 16, 2020, the Vikings placed a second-round restricted free agent tender on Wilson. He signed the one-year contract on May 8, 2020. In Week 2 against the Indianapolis Colts, Wilson recorded his first career interception off a pass thrown by Philip Rivers during the 28–11 loss. In Week 5 against the Seattle Seahawks on Sunday Night Football, Wilson recorded a sack on Russell Wilson and intercepted a pass thrown by Wilson during the 27–26 loss. In Week 8 against the Green Bay Packers, Wilson recovered a fumble forced by teammate D. J. Wonnum on Aaron Rodgers late in the fourth quarter to secure a 28–22 Vikings' win.

Philadelphia Eagles
Wilson signed a one-year contract with the Philadelphia Eagles on April 14, 2021. He was named the starting middle linebacker alongside T. J. Edwards. He started two of seven games played before being released on November 3, 2021.

Houston Texans
On November 4, 2021, Wilson was claimed off waivers by the Houston Texans.

New Orleans Saints
On May 16, 2022, Wilson signed with the New Orleans Saints. He was released on August 30, 2022 and signed to the practice squad the next day.

Green Bay Packers
On October 4, 2022, Wilson was signed by the Green Bay Packers off of the New Orleans Saints' practice squad. On October 16, he blocked a punt by Braden Mann during a Week 6 loss to the New York Jets.

References

External links

Green Bay Packers bio

Cincinnati Bearcats bio

College stats

Living people
1994 births
21st-century African-American sportspeople
African-American players of American football
Players of American football from Michigan
Sportspeople from Wayne County, Michigan
American football linebackers
Northwestern Wildcats football players
Cincinnati Bearcats football players
Minnesota Vikings players
Philadelphia Eagles players
Houston Texans players
New Orleans Saints players
Green Bay Packers players
People from Redford, Michigan